Teremky is a station on the Kyiv Metro's Obolonsko–Teremkivska Line opened on 6 November 2013. It is the southern end of the line, located just after the Ipodrom station. The station is named after the Teremky neighborhood of Kyiv.

At the opening of the Ipodrom station on 25 October 2012 (then) Ukrainian Prime Minister Mykola Azarov had stated that the Teremky station "would soon open". According to planning the station should have opened on 24 August 2013, Independence Day of Ukraine. But instead it was opened on 6 November 2013, on that day was celebrated Day of Kyiv's liberation from Nazi invaders.

References

External links
Photos of the station by UNIAN

Kyiv Metro stations
Holosiivskyi District
Railway stations opened in 2013
2013 establishments in Ukraine